The Nokia 7.1 is a discontinued Nokia-branded mid-range smartphone by HMD Global. It was launched on October 5, 2018 and released on October 28. It is an upgraded version of the Nokia 7, featuring a Qualcomm Snapdragon 636 processor. It was discontinued in July 2019.

See also 
 Nokia X7-00
 Nokia 3310 (2017)
 Nokia Lumia 730
 Nokia Lumia 735

References 

7.1
Mobile phones introduced in 2018
Mobile phones with multiple rear cameras
Mobile phones with 4K video recording
Discontinued smartphones